David Cortez Clowney (born August 13, 1938), known by the stage name Dave "Baby" Cortez, is an American pop and R&B organist and pianist, best known for his 1959 hit, "The Happy Organ".

Life and career
Clowney was born in Detroit, Michigan, United States, and attended Northwestern High School in the city. His father played the piano, and encouraged him to pursue a musical career. Clowney played the piano for 10 years, then he took up the organ. He made his first record in 1956 under his own name, and also sang with two doo-wop groups, the Pearls and the Valentines, in the mid-1950s.

Dave Clowney was well known in black pop-music circles as the musical director for Little Anthony and the Imperials. Clowney was scheduled to record his original song "The Happy Organ" during a 1959 recording session. The microphones were positioned for a vocal, but Clowney demurred: "I didn't like the vocal, because I'm not a great singer," he recalled in 2012. He noticed a Hammond electric organ sitting unused in a corner of the studio. "Usually, when you go into a studio, they have the Hammond organ covered up. People weren't using it then, except in gospel, mostly. I said, 'Let me try this thing here.'"

"The Happy Organ" was the first pop/rock hit to feature the electronic organ as lead instrument; it featured drummer Gary Hammond and was co-written by the celebrity photographer James J. Kriegsmann and frequent collaborator Kurt Wood. The guitar solo was by session musician Wild Jimmy Spruill. The record, crediting Clowney as Dave "Baby" Cortez, was the first instrumental No. 1 on Billboard magazine's Hot 100 chart. The original 45-rpm single was released on the independent Clock Records label, but the LP which featured it was released by RCA Victor by arrangement with Clock.

Cortez had another Top Ten hit in 1962 with "Rinky Dink" on Chess Records. This record became well known in the UK as the signature tune of the Saturday afternoon program Professional Wrestling, introduced by Kent Walton, although few knew the name of the tune or the artist. The song has a strong resemblance to 1957's "Love Is Strange" by Mickey & Sylvia, since it used the same guitar riff. After changing his focus to vocals and recording the minor hit, "Unaddressed Letter", he had his final pop hit in 1973, with "Someone Has Taken Your Place", on the All Platinum label.

In 2011, after a 38-year hiatus from recording, Cortez returned with a new album on Norton Records backed by Lonnie Youngblood and His Bloodhounds, including underground luminary Mick Collins of the Dirtbombs and the Gories.

Discography

Albums
Dave "Baby" Cortez and His Happy Organ (RCA Records, 1959)
Dave "Baby" Cortez (Clock Records, 1960)
The Fabulous Organ of Dave "Baby" Cortez (Metro Records, 1960)
Music 'Round the Clock (Clock, 1961)
Rinky Dink (Chess Records, 1962)
Organ Shindig (Roulette Records, 1965)
Tweety Pie (Roulette, 1966)
In Orbit with Dave "Baby" Cortez (Roulette, 1966)
Baby Cortez the Isley Brothers Way (T-Neck Records, 1970)
Soul Vibration (All Platinum Records, 1972)
With Lonnie Youngblood and His Bloodhounds (Norton Records, 2011)

Chart singles

References

External links
Dave Cortez Interview - NAMM Oral History Library (2012)
 
 

1938 births
Living people
American pop keyboardists
American male organists
Musicians from Detroit
Okeh Records artists
RCA Victor artists
Chess Records artists
21st-century organists
21st-century American male musicians
20th-century American keyboardists
20th-century American male musicians
20th-century African-American musicians
21st-century African-American musicians
American organists